The 2013 Victory Bowl was a college football bowl game played on November 23, 2013 at Barron Stadium in Rome, Georgia. The Cougars trounced the Panthers, 67–0. Azusa Pacific is an NCAA Division II school, while Greenville plays in Division III. Azusa Pacific (APU) set a record for the most points scored in a Victory Bowl in their first appearance, which was also the only shutout in the game's history. APU outgained Greenville 388 yards to 111 and scored nine touchdowns.

Game play

First quarter
Azusa Pacific jumped out to a 21–0 lead on two touchdown runs by Terrell Watson and one by Justin McPherson. Greenville went three-and-out four times in the quarter for zero total net yards.

Second quarter
Watson got his third score of the game early in the quarter on an eight-yard TD run. Tanner Henry and Ed Dillihunt caught touchdown passes from Dasmen Stewart later in the quarter before Jamie Cacciatore's 42-yard field goal as time expired made the score 44–0 at halftime.

Third quarter
Stewart opened the quarter with another TD pass to Henry before Cacciatore connected on a 25-yard field goal. Sam Flemming intercepted Greenville quarterback Brendan Chambers for a 48-yard return touchdown to extend the lead to 61–0.

Fourth quarter
Tarik Myles broke free for a 71-yard run on the Cougars' first drive to get to the Greenville 10. McPherson ran three times on the next series, punching in a one-yard touchdown on fourth down. The PAT was blocked, making the score 67–0.

References

Victory Bowl
Victory Bowl
Victory Bowl
Azusa Pacific Cougars football bowl games
Greenville Panthers football bowl games
November 2013 sports events in the United States
Victory Bowl